Granville High School is  a four-year comprehensive public high school located in  Granville, Ohio.  It is accredited by the State of Ohio Department of Education. GHS is a member of the Licking County League.

Ohio High School Athletic Association State Championships

 Boys Golf - 1996, 2001 
 Girls Cross Country - 2014, 2022 
 Girls Softball - 2015

References

External links
 Granville Exempted Village School District Homepage
 School website

High schools in Licking County, Ohio
Public high schools in Ohio